Jean-François Boisard (born around 1762 – 1820) in Caen was a French painter and poet. Boisard was initially interested in painting but shifted to poetry constructively.
 
He left France at the time of the French Revolution and was part of the "émigration", namely the royalist families supposed to plot against the new regime from foreign countries. He nevertheless returned to France at the worst moment, namely during the "Terreur" of 1793, during which close to 40,000 persons were arrested and executed. He was himself condemned to death but escaped the sentencing for unknown reasons. He then lived a miserable life, constantly on the move and dependent on alms and the assistance of dignitaries for whom he wrote dedications.
 
His fate somewhat improved with the Bourbon Restoration in 1815. He published two collections of some 300 fables "dedicated to the king", in 1817 and 1822 (Fables dédiées au roi). Their quality can certainly not be compared with the work of his uncle.
 
The date of his death is not known precisely but was between 1821 and 1823.

Works

Fables dédiées au roi, Paris 1817.
Fables faisant suite à celles qui sont dédiées au roi. Paris, 1822.

References
Frere, Edouard: Manuel du bibliographe normand. Rouen, 1858. Vol I
Grente, Georges: Dictionnaires des Lettres françaises. Le Dix-huitième siècle. Paris 1960, Vol. I
Hoefer, Jean Chrétien Ferdinand: Nouvelle Biographie générale, depuis les temps les plus reculés jusqu’à nos jours. Paris, 1862. Vol. VI
La Grande Encyclopédie, inventaire raisonné des Sciences, des Lettres et des Arts, Paris 1902, Tome VII
Encyclopédie universelle du XXe siècle, Lettres, Sciences, Arts. Paris 1908, Tome II
 
NOTE: One can notice that, in consulting the above-mentioned references, several other Boisard appear. They are less known authors of the 18th – 19th centuries, such as for instance: François Boisard who published a novel in 5 volumes, Pastorale, and various studies on the topography and the history of the cities of his region (Calvados). Another Boisard was a regular contributor to the Mémorial du Calvados and the author of a work on "Les Cziganys de Hongrie" (The Gypsies of Hungary). Claude Florimond Boisard (de Ponteau) was a famous comic author. Moreover, he was the author of almost all mimes and ballets presented at the Opéra-Comique de Paris, when his was its director, from 1728 to 1742.

External links

Artists from Caen
1762 births
1821 deaths
Writers from Caen
18th-century French painters
French male painters
19th-century French painters
19th-century French poets
People of the French Revolution
French fabulists
19th-century French male artists
18th-century French male artists